Minot Joy "Cap" Crowell (September 5, 1892 – September 30, 1962) was an American Major League Baseball pitcher. He attended Brown University.

References

Major League Baseball pitchers
Philadelphia Athletics players
Baltimore Orioles (IL) players
Baseball players from Massachusetts
Brown University alumni
1892 births
1962 deaths